Antonio Pestalozza (1784–1865) was an Italian politician and a rector of Milan.

References

1784 births
1865 deaths
19th-century Italian politicians